"Agua" (Spanish: "Water") is a song by Puerto Rican producer Tainy and Colombian singer J Balvin. The track was released on 9 July 2020 by NEON16 and Interscope Records as the theme song and lead single off the soundtrack to the 2020 film The SpongeBob Movie: Sponge on the Run. "Agua" is prominently characterized by a sample of the SpongeBob SquarePants theme song throughout the track.

Composition and lyrics
"Agua" is a reggaeton track that samples the SpongeBob SquarePants theme song throughout the track, though Stephen Hillenburg was credited as a co-writer of "Agua". Regarding this track, J Balvin expressed that the track "has good vibes and a lot of happiness, which we need during these moments." Throughout the song, Balvin makes numerous references to SpongeBob characters and settings in the lyrics, and he interpolates part of the SpongeBob theme song in the track's bridge.

Music video
The music video for "Agua" premiered on J Balvin's YouTube channel on 15 July 2020. The video reached 35.9 million views in its first tracking week and has amassed over 530 million views as of January 2021.

Charts

Weekly charts

Year-end charts

Certifications

See also
List of Billboard number-one Latin songs of 2020

References

2020 singles
2020 songs
Tainy songs
J Balvin songs
Number-one singles in Spain
Song recordings produced by Tainy
Songs written by J Balvin
Songs written by Tainy
Songs written for animated films
Songs written for films
Spanish-language songs
SpongeBob SquarePants (film series)